Nanna Prathigne (Kannada: ನನ್ನ ಪ್ರತಿಜ್ಞೆ) is a 1985 Indian Kannada film, directed by K. S. R. Das and produced by Padmanabham. The film stars Vishnuvardhan, Ahalya, Vajramuni and Kanchana in the lead roles. The film has musical score by Chellapilla Satyam.

Cast

Vishnuvardhan
Ahalya
Vajramuni
Kanchana
B. Jayashree
Lakshmi
Sulochana
Kuchalashree
Malleshwari

References

External links
 

1985 films
1980s Kannada-language films
Films directed by K. S. R. Das
Films scored by Satyam (composer)